Southern Russian is one of the main groups of Russian dialects.

Territory 
 The territory of the primary formation (i.e. that consists of "Old" Russia of the 16th century before Eastern conquests by Ivan IV) is entirely 11 modern regions (oblasts): Belgorod, Bryansk,  Kaluga, Kursk, Lipetsk, Oryol, Ryazan, Smolensk, Tambov, Tula, Voronezh; and some southern parts of 3 regions: Moscow, Pskov, and Tver
 The territory of the second formation (i.e. where Russians settled after the 16th century) consists of most of the land of lower Don and Volga, the Northern Caucasus, as well as Southern Ural, Siberia, and Far East.

Phonology 
 Fricative  instead of the Standard and Northern . Soft  is usually .
 Semivowel  in the place of the Standard and Northern  and final .
  where the Standard and Northern have .
 Prosthetic  before  and stressed : во́кна, ву́лица, Standard Russian окна, улица "windows, street".
 Prosthetic  before  and : етот, ентот, Standard Russian этот "this".
 In Pskov (southern) and Ryazan sub-groups only one voiceless affricate exists.

Morphology 
 Palatalized final  in 3rd person forms of verbs (this is unpalatalized in the Standard and Northern dialects): он ходить, они ходять "he goes, they go"
 Occasional dropping of the 3rd person ending  at all: он ходи, они ходя "he goes, they go"
 Oblique case forms of personal pronouns мяне́, табе́, сабе́ instead of Standard Russian мне, тебе, себе "me, you, -self".

Relation to other languages 
Some of these features such as akanye/yakanye, a debuccalized or lenited , a semivowel , and palatalized final  in 3rd person forms of verbs are also present in modern Belarusian and some dialects of Ukrainian (Eastern Polesian), indicating a linguistic continuum.

See also
Central Russian dialects
Northern Russian dialects

References

Bibliography

External links
 М.О. Garder, N.S. Petrova, А.B. Moroz, А.B. Panova, N.R. Dobrushina. Corpus of Spiridonova Buda dialect. 2018. Moscow: Linguistic Convergence Laboratory, HSE.
 A.V. Ter-Avanesova, F.A. Balabin, S.V. Dyachenko, A.V. Malysheva, V.A. Morozova. Corpus of the Malinino dialect. 2019. Moscow: Linguistic Convergence Laboratory, NRU HSE. URL; Vinogradov Russian Language Institute of the Russian Academy of Sciences.
 A.V. Ter-Avanesova, S.V. Dyachenko, E.V. Kolesnikova, A.V. Malysheva, D.I. Ignatenko, A.B. Panova, N.R. Dobrushina. Corpus of Rogovatka dialect. 2018. Moscow: Linguistic Convergence Laboratory, NRU HSE.

Russian dialects